The Eastern Wrestling League (EWL) was an NCAA Division I wrestling-only conference. It was made up mostly of schools from the northeastern United States whose primary conferences did not sponsor wrestling as an NCAA-qualifying event. The teams had traditionally rotated as hosts of the qualifying tournament.

The league's inaugural season was in 1976 (during the 1975–76 academic year) and had a charter group led by Penn State, Pittsburgh, Buffalo and three Pennsylvania State Athletic Conference (PSAC) schools in Bloomsburg, Clarion and Lock Haven. After 1977, Buffalo left the league, but West Virginia and Cleveland State were added, growing the league to seven teams. In 1988–89, the PSAC's Edinboro joined to form an eight-team league.

After the 1991–92 season, Penn State left the league when the university joined the Big Ten Conference, which holds its own NCAA Division I Championships qualifying tournament. In 1998–99, Virginia Tech joined the league, but the Hokies left following the 2003–04 season and joined the Atlantic Coast Conference (ACC) after receiving an invitation to join for all sports. West Virginia left the EWL when it became an all-sports member of the Big 12 Conference in July 2012 and Pittsburgh moved to the ACC in July 2013.

In 2013, the league announced that George Mason and Rider had accepted invitations to join the conference beginning in the 2013–14 academic year. Both schools were previously members of the Colonial Athletic Association, with George Mason being a full CAA member and Rider an associate whose primary conference (MAAC) does not sponsor wrestling. GMU left the CAA and joined the non-wrestling Atlantic 10 Conference. The departure of George Mason also led to the end of CAA sponsorship of wrestling in 2013. Four of the other EWL schools are normally members of the Division II PSAC. Cleveland State, which had announced it would drop wrestling at the end of the 2015–16 school year, but later reinstated the program without interruption, is a member of the non-wrestling Horizon League.

On March 5, 2019, the seven members of the EWL accepted affiliate membership to the Mid-American Conference starting in the 2019-2020 season.

Schools

Final members
Bloomsburg Huskies (1975–2019)
Clarion Golden Eagles (1975–2019)
Cleveland State Vikings (1977–2019)
Edinboro Fighting Scots (1988–2019)
George Mason Patriots (2013–2019)
Lock Haven Bald Eagles (1975–2019)
Rider Broncs (2013–2019)

Schools leaving before 2018–19
Buffalo Bulls (1975–1977)
Millersville Marauders (1981–1984)
Penn State Nittany Lions (1975–1992)
Pittsburgh Panthers (1975–2013)
Virginia Tech Hokies (1998–2004)
West Virginia Mountaineers (1977–2012)

Membership timeline

Team dual meet champions
EWL Team Dual Meet Champions

1976 Penn State
1977 Penn State
1978 Penn State
1979 Cleveland State
1980 Clarion
1981 Clarion
1982 Penn State
1983 Penn State
1984 Penn State
1985 Penn State
1986 Penn State & Clarion
1987 Penn State
1988 Penn State
1989 Penn State
1990 West Virginia

1991 West Virginia
1992 Penn State
1993 Lock Haven & Bloomsburg
1994 Edinboro
1995 Lock Haven
1996 Edinboro
1997 Edinboro
1998 West Virginia
1999 Edinboro
2000 Edinboro
2001 Edinboro
2002 West Virginia
2003 West Virginia
2004 Edinboro
2005 Edinboro

2006 Edinboro
2007 Edinboro
2008 Edinboro
2009 Edinboro
2010 Pittsburgh
2011 Pittsburgh
2012 Pittsburgh
2013 Bloomsburg
2014 Edinboro
2015 Edinboro
2016 Edinboro
2017 Edinboro
2018 Edinboro and Rider
2019 Lock Haven

Team tournament champions
EWL Team Tournament Champions

1976 Penn State
1977 Penn State
1978 Penn State
1979 Cleveland State
1980 Clarion
1981 Bloomsburg
1982 Penn State
1983 Penn State
1984 Penn State
1985 Penn State
1996 Penn State
1987 Penn State
1988 Penn State
1989 Penn State
1990 Penn State

1991 Penn State
1992 Penn State
1993 Bloomsburg
1994 Clarion
1995 Clarion
1996 West Virginia
1997 Lock Haven
1998 Edinboro
1999 Edinboro
2000 Edinboro
2001 Edinboro
2002 West Virginia
2003 Edinboro
2004 Edinboro & West Virginia
2005 Edinboro

2006 Edinboro
2007 Edinboro
2008 Edinboro
2009 Edinboro
2010 Edinboro
2011 Pittsburgh
2012 Pittsburgh
2013 Pittsburgh
2014 Edinboro
2015 Edinboro
2016 Rider
2017 Edinboro
2018 Lock Haven
2019 Lock Haven

References

External links
 

 
Sports leagues established in 1975
Sports leagues disestablished in 2019